The Blue Peter is a 1928 British silent adventure film directed by Arthur Rooke and starring Matheson Lang, Gladys Frazin, and Mary Dibley. The film was based on the 1925 play The Blue Peter by E. Temple Thurston.

Premise
After returning home to Britain from Nigeria where he has been working, an engineer becomes embroiled in a family melodrama.

Cast
 Matheson Lang as David Hunter 
 Gladys Frazin as Rosa Callaghan 
 Mary Dibley as Emma 
 Cameron Carr as Edward Formby 
 A. Bromley Davenport as Mr. Callaghan 
 Esmond Knight as Radio operator

References

Bibliography
 Low, Rachael. History of the British Film, 1918-1929. George Allen & Unwin, 1971.

External links

1928 films
1928 adventure films
British adventure films
1920s English-language films
Films directed by Arthur Rooke
British silent feature films
British films based on plays
Films shot at Walthamstow Studios
British black-and-white films
Silent adventure films
1920s British films